Jacques Marie Frangile Bigot (1818–1893) was a French naturalist and entomologist most noted for his studies of Diptera. Bigot was born in Paris, France, where he lived all his life, though he had a small house in Quincy-sous-Sénart, Essonne. He became a member of the Entomological Society of France in 1844, and his first paper was published in its Annals in 1845, as was most of his later work. Bigot was a prolific author, and, like Francis Walker, his work was the subject of much later criticism.
      
Bigot's collection of exotic (extra-European) Tabanidae and Syrphidae was purchased by George Henry Verrall, who gave it to the Natural History Museum in London. The exotic Asilidae and all his European Diptera were presented to the Hope Department of Entomology of Oxford University. The Coleoptera and Hemiptera were presented to the Entomological Society of France by A. P. Mauppin in 1899.

Selected works
1845?- 18—Diptères nouveaux ou peu connus long series in Ann Soc.Ent.Fr. online
1858 Diptères de Madagascar
1888 Enumération des Diptères recueillis en Tunisie
1892 Voyage de Alluaud dans le territoire d'Assinie (Afrique occidentale) en 1886 :Diptères 

A complete list of Bigot's works is given by Evenhuis, N.L. 2003. The complete bibliography of scientific works of Jacques-Marie-Frangille Bigot. Zootaxa 210: 1-36 and the genera erected by Bigot are discussed in Evenhuis, N.L. & Pont, A.C. (2004): The Diptera Genera of Jacques-Marie-Frangile Bigot. Zootaxa 751: 1-94; Auckland.

Note
Another French entomologist specializing in Lepidoptera, Louis Bigot (publishing 1963 to present), should not be confused.

External links
EOL Encyclopedia of Life Taxa described by Bigot.Complete and many supported by images.Type Bigot into the search box
 Gaedike, R.; Groll, E. K. & Taeger, A. 2012: Bibliography of the entomological literature from the beginning until 1863 : online database - version 1.0 - Senckenberg Deutsches Entomologisches Institut. Full bibliography

1818 births
1893 deaths
Scientists from Paris
French entomologists
French naturalists
Presidents of the Société entomologique de France
Dipterists